Pyramid Hill is a town in Victoria, Australia in the Shire of Loddon  north of Melbourne and  north of Bendigo. The town has a railway station.

The town is named after a nearby hill that rises 180 metres above sea level.  Originally the town was situated at the base of Pyramid Hill, but was relocated when the railway station was built.

The Post Office opened on 17 November 1875. The railway arrived in 1884.

The town has an Australian Rules football team, Pyramid Hill Football Netball Club competes in the Loddon Valley Football League.

Golfers play at the course of the Pyramid Hill Golf Club on Victoria Street.

The town has one radio station which broadcasts a syndicated programme from the Power Country FM group on the 88 MHz frequency.

References

External links

Community website
Department of Sustainability and Environment: Know Your Area - Pyramid Hill
Sydney Morning Herald: Travel - Pyramid Hill
Pyramid Hill Sydney Morning Herald 8 February 2004
Pyramid Hill Football Netball Club SportsTG

Towns in Victoria (Australia)
Shire of Loddon